"Whatever She Wants" is a song written and performed by Jars of Clay. The song is the fourth and final radio single from the band's 2002 studio album, The Eleventh Hour.

Track listing
"Whatever She Wants" – 3:41 (Dan Haseltine, Matt Odmark, Stephen Mason, & Charlie Lowell)

Charts
 No. 11 Christian Rock

2002 singles
2002 songs
Jars of Clay songs
Songs written by Dan Haseltine
Songs written by Charlie Lowell
Songs written by Stephen Mason (musician)
Songs written by Matt Odmark
Essential Records (Christian) singles